William Slater (18 April 1940 – 2 February 2019) was a Canadian swimmer. He competed in two events at the 1956 Summer Olympics.

References

External links
 

1940 births
2019 deaths
Canadian male swimmers
Olympic swimmers of Canada
Swimmers at the 1956 Summer Olympics
Swimmers from Vancouver
Commonwealth Games medallists in swimming
Commonwealth Games bronze medallists for Canada
Swimmers at the 1958 British Empire and Commonwealth Games
Medallists at the 1958 British Empire and Commonwealth Games